The city of Richmond Hill, Ontario has 165 parks operated by the City of Richmond Hill Parks, Recreation, and Culture department.

Municipal parks

A–B
Ada Mackenzie 
Alias Grace Park
Amos Wright Park
Apple Grove Parkette
Artisan Park
Autumn Grove Park
Baif Park
Bayview Hill Park
Bayview Parkette
Beaufort Hills Park
Beverly Acres Parkette
Black Willow Park
Bradstock Park
Briar Nine Park & Reserve
Brickworks Park
Bridgeview Cordone Park
Bridgeview Park
Burr Park

C–E
Cardinal Woods Park
Carrville Park
Channel Gate Parkette
Chapman Park
Coons Parkette
Cordave Parkette
Crosby Park
David Dunlap Observatory Park
David Hamilton Park
Debonair Parkette
Delbert Baker Pond & Garden
Discovery Parkette
Doncrest Valley
Dorothy Price Park
Dove Park
Dovestone Park
Dr. James Langstaff Community Park
Essex ParketteEyer Homestead Park

F–H
Fiddlehead Parkette
Fontainbleu Park
Four Winds Pond
Frank Endean Parkette
French Royalist Park
Fulton Parkette
Gapper Park
Glenbrae Park
Good Brothers Parkette
Grace Lawrence Parkette
Grist Mill Park
Grovewood Park
Harding Park
Harrington Park
Headwaters Community Park
Helmkay Park
Heritage Woods Park
Heron Pond
Hillcrest Heights Park
Hillsview Park
Horner Park
Hughy Park
Humber Flats Ecopark
Hunter's Point Wildlife Park

J–L
Jessie Vanek Park
John Tipp Park
Junction Parkette
Karindon Park
King's College Park
Kozak Parkette
Lake Wilcox Fish & Wildlife Refuge
Lake Wilcox Park
Larchmere Parkette
Larratt Lea Park
Laurentian Park
Lavinia White Parkette
Lennox Park
Leno Park
Lilac Grove Parkette
Little Don Park

M–O
Macleod's Landing Park
Maplewood Park
Mary Dawson Park
Matthew Dinning Memorial Parkette
Meander Park
Melinda Clarke Parkette
Mill Pond Park
Minthorn Park
Mitchell Pond
Monticello Park
Moraine Park
Morgan Boyle Park
Mount Pleasant Park
Newberry Park
Newkirk Park
North Richvale Greenway
North Shore Parkette
Oak Ridges Lions Club Park
Oak Ridges Meadow
Ozark Park

P

Palmer Park
Parker Park
Patterson Parkette
Penwick Park
Philips Ridge Park
Phillips Park
Phyllis Rawlinson Park
Pine Farm Park
Pine Needle Park
Pioneer Park
Pleasantville Park
Poplar Forest Parkette

R

Raccoon Park
Railway Parkette
Ransom Parkette
Red Maple Parkette
Red Oak Parkette
Redstone Park
Richmond Green Sports Centre & Park
Richvale Athletic Field
Ritter Park
Rocking Horse Ranch
Rouge Crest Park
Rumble Pond Park
Russell Farm Park
Russell Tilt Park

S
Shaun Beggs Park
Shaw Parkette
Shelter Woods Parkette
Silver Pines Parkette
Silver Stream Park
Skopit Park
Snakes & Ladders Park
Southview Park
Spadina Parkette
Springbrook Park
Spruce Avenue Parkette
Stavert Park
Sussex Park
Sweet Grass Hill Park

T–V
Tadpole Parkette
Tannery Park
Temperanceville Park
The Richmond Hill Rotary Club Park
Timber Mill Park
Toll Bar Park
Town Park
Tree House Parkette
Twickenham Park
Unity Park
Vanderburgh Park

W–Z
Walnut Grove Park
Webster Park
Weldrick Parkette
Westview Parkette
White Oak Parkette
William Bond Park
William H. Graham Parkette
William Harrison Park
William Neal Community Park
Willow Grove Park
Willow Hollow Park
Winbourne Park
Windham Parkette
Wood's Park
Woodside Parkette
Worthington Parkette
Wyldwood Gardens

External links
List of parks at Town or Richmond Hill

Richmond Hill, Ontario
Richmond Hill
Richmond Hill